Karl Scherm (8 April 1904 – 30 June 1977) was a German international footballer.

References

1904 births
1977 deaths
Association football forwards
German footballers
Germany international footballers